M. Mandy Dawson ( Muriel Mandy Dawson; July 18, 1956) was a Democratic member of the Florida Senate, representing the 29th District from 1999 to 2008. Previously she was a member of the Florida House of Representatives from 1993 through 1998.

Early life and education 
Dawson was born in Fort Lauderdale and moved to Daytona Beach when she was six years old. She attended Florida A&M University from 1975 to 1980 and earned a Bachelor of Science degree in social work from Barry University.

Career 
She was the first African-American female elected to the Florida Legislature from Broward County. During her time in the legislature, she worked on bills restoring civil rights for ex-offenders, penalties for leaving children in locked cars, and keeping Black physicians on managed care panels to address health care inequalities. Since leaving office, she has worked as a political campaign manager.

Personal life 
She married Hobson Bethune, a retired Marine and longtime youth athletics coach, in 2010. Bethune died in 2017.

Mandy Dawson suffered from chronic back pain requiring hospitalization and surgery. She later became addicted to prescription drugs. In 2002, Dawson was arrested and charged with felony prescription drug fraud for altering a painkiller prescription from 60 pills to 160. In return for dismissal of the charges, she entered a pretrial intervention program.

On July 20, 2011, Dawson was charged with federal income tax evasion and failure to file tax returns. In court papers filed in early February 2012, Dawson signaled her intention to plead guilty to the tax evasion charges.

References

External links
Project Vote Smart - Senator Muriel Mandy Dawson (FL) profile

|-

|-

Democratic Party Florida state senators
Democratic Party members of the Florida House of Representatives
1956 births
Politicians from Fort Lauderdale, Florida
Living people
Women state legislators in Florida
Florida politicians convicted of crimes
African-American state legislators in Florida
20th-century American politicians
20th-century American women politicians
21st-century American politicians
21st-century American women politicians
20th-century African-American women
20th-century African-American politicians
21st-century African-American women
21st-century African-American politicians